école Internationale is a private English-medium international school in Kandy, Sri Lanka. It is the first international School in the central province.

History 
The school was founded in 1980 by Mrs. Manel Rajapakse at 85, Lady Gordon’s drive, with a handful of foreign students. To accommodate the increased intake of local students, a new branch was opened in 1991 at Digana for senior grades. The junior school remained in Kandy.

Curriculum
The school uses curricula from the British and American education systems at primary school level. The senior students are steered towards the British curriculum leading to Edexcel International GCSE, GCE AS and A2 qualifications.

Facilities and extracurricular activities 
Extracurricular activities at the school include sports, music, literature, drama and other activities. The academic facilities include biology, physics and chemistry laboratories, a computer lab, reference library with internet access and multimedia-based education. Sports facilities include a swimming pool,a netball court, playground and a gymnasium for indoor sports. Yoga and karate are also available, coached by professionals.

Insurance Policy
In 2014, the school announced an insurance policy agreement with Ceylinco Life, allowing students to continue their education at the school in the event of the premature death or disability of their parents.

References

External links
Official Website

Educational institutions established in 1980
International schools in Sri Lanka
Schools in Kandy